Roberto Bautista Agut was the defending champion, but lost in the semifinals to David Goffin.

Grigor Dimitrov won the title, defeating Goffin in the final, 7–5, 6–4.

Seeds
The top four seeds receive a bye into the second round.

Draw

Finals

Top half

Bottom half

Qualifying

Seeds

Qualifiers

Lucky losers

Qualifying draw

First qualifier

Second qualifier

Third qualifier

Fourth qualifier

References
 Main Draw
 Qualifying Draw

Sofia Open
2017